Tenure is a category of academic appointment existing in some countries. A tenured post is an indefinite academic appointment that can be terminated only for cause or under extraordinary circumstances, such as financial exigency or program discontinuation. Tenure is a means of defending the principle of academic freedom, which holds that it is beneficial for society in the long run if scholars are free to hold and examine a variety of views.

By country

United States and Canada 

Under the tenure systems adopted by many universities and colleges in the United States and Canada, some faculty positions have tenure and some do not. Typical systems (such as the widely adopted "1940 Statement of Principles on Academic Freedom and Tenure" of the American Association of University Professors) allow only a limited period to establish a record of published research, ability to attract grant funding, academic visibility, teaching excellence, and administrative or community service. They limit the number of years that any employee can remain employed as a non-tenured instructor or professor, compelling the institution to grant tenure to or terminate an individual, with significant advance notice, at the end of a specified time period. Some institutions require promotion to Associate Professor as a condition of tenure. A university may also offer research positions or professional track and clinical track academic positions which are said to be "non-tenure track". Positions with titles such as Instructor, Lecturer, Adjunct Professor, Research Professor etc. do not carry the possibility of tenure, have higher teaching loads (other than maybe the research positions), have less influence within the institution, lower compensation with few or no benefits (see Adjunct professor), and little protection of academic freedom.

In response to Nazi manipulations of university faculty in Germany and Poland, the modern conception of tenure in US higher education originated with the American Association of University Professors' (AAUP) 1940 Statement of Principles on Academic Freedom and Tenure. Jointly formulated and endorsed by the AAUP and the Association of American Colleges and Universities (AAC&U), the 1940 Statement is endorsed by over 250 scholarly and higher education organizations and is widely adopted into faculty handbooks and collective bargaining agreements at institutions of higher education throughout the United States. This statement holds that, "The common good depends upon the free search for truth and its free exposition" and stresses that academic freedom is essential in teaching and research in this regard.

In the United States, tenure rights for teachers serving in (K-12) public schools also have been in existence for more than a hundred years.

United Kingdom 

The original form of academic tenure was removed in the United Kingdom in 1988. In its place there is the distinction between permanent and temporary contracts for academics. A permanent lecturer in UK universities usually holds an open-ended position that covers teaching, research, and administrative responsibilities.

Germany 

Academics are divided into two classes: On the one hand, professors (W2/W3&C3/C4 positions in the new&old systems of pay grades) are employed as state civil servants and hold tenure as highly safeguarded lifetime employment; On the other hand, there is a much larger group of "junior staff" on fixed-term contracts, research grants, fellowships and part-time jobs. In 2010, 9% of academic staff were professors, 66% were "junior staff" (including doctoral candidates on contracts), and 25% were other academic staff in secondary employment. Permanent research, teaching and management positions below professorship as an "Akademischer Rat" (a civil service position salaried like high school teachers) have become relatively rare compared to the 1970s and 1980s and are often no longer refilled after a retirement. In order to attain the position of Professor, in some fields, an academic must usually complete a "Habilitation" (a kind of broader second PhD thesis; the very highest degree available within the university, entitling the holder to be a "full professor"), after which they are eligible for tenureship. This means that, compared to other countries, academics in Germany obtain tenure at a relatively late age, as on average one becomes an Academic Assistant at the age of 42. In 2002 the "Juniorprofessur" position (comparable to an assistant professor in the US, but not always endowed with a tenure track) was introduced as an alternative to "Habilitation". However, the degree of formal equivalence between a "Habilitation" and a successfully completed "Juniorprofessur" varies across the different states (Bundesländer), and the informal recognition of having served as a "Juniorprofessur" as a replacement for the "Habilitation" in the appointment procedures for professorships varies greatly between disciplines.

Due to a university system that guarantees universities relative academic freedom, the position of professor in Germany is relatively strong and independent. As civil servants, professors have a series of attendant rights and benefits, yet this status is subject to discussion. In the W pay scale the professorial pay is related to performance rather than merely to age, as it was in C.

Denmark 
Danish universities in advertisements for faculty positions usually state that professor positions are tenured. However, the interpretation of tenure at Danish universities has been a matter of controversy.

Denmark adopted a more hierarchical management approach for universities in the early 2000s. This new system was introduced by parliament on proposal by the Minister of Science, Technology and Development, Helge Sander, based on his vision that Danish universities in the future should compete about funding in analogy to football clubs in order to increase their attention to marketing and industry.

The controversial understanding of tenure in Denmark was demonstrated by University of Copenhagen in 2016, when the university fired the internationally renowned professor, Hans Thybo, after 37 years of employment in academic positions. A later court decision ruled the dismissal illegal after a court hearing demonstrated that the university's reasons for the dismissal were false accusations by managers, but the university did not reinstall Thybo in his position. The university maintained the dismissal after having received written statement from the postdoc that the accusation was false, and that Thybo never put pressure on him to do anything. This particular university carried out other similar dismissals after Thybo's case.

Arguments in favor 

Defenders of tenure, like Ellen Schrecker and Aeon J. Skoble, generally acknowledge flaws in how tenure approvals are currently run and problems in how tenured professors might use their time, security, and power; however, as Skoble puts it, the "downsides are either not as bad as claimed, or [are] costs outweighed by the benefits"—and he points out that the very debate about tenure in which he is engaging is made possible by the academic freedom which tenure makes possible. "Tenure remains scholars' best defense of free inquiry and heterodoxy," writes Skoble, "especially in these times of heightened polarization and internet outrage. Let us focus on fixing it, not scrapping it."

The job security granted by tenure is necessary to recruit talented individuals into university professorships, because in many fields private industry jobs pay significantly more; as Schrecker puts it, providing professors "the kind of job security that most other workers can only dream of" counterbalances universities' inability to compete with the private sector: "Universities, after all, are not corporations and cannot provide the kinds of financial remuneration that similarly educated individuals in other fields expect."  Furthermore, Schrecker continues, because research positions require extreme specialization, they must consolidate the frequency and intensity of performance evaluations across a given career, and they cannot have the same flexibility or turnover rates as other jobs, making the tenure process a practical necessity: "A mathematician cannot teach a class on medieval Islam, nor can an art historian run an organic chemistry lab.  Moreover, there is no way that the employing institution can provide the kind of retraining that would facilitate such a transformation... even the largest and most well-endowed institution lacks the resources to reevaluate and replace its medieval Islamicists and algebraic topologists every year.  Tenure thus lets the academic community avoid excessive turnover while still ensuring the quality of the institution's faculty.  It is structured around two assessments -- one at hiring, the other some six years later -- that are far more rigorous than those elsewhere in society and give the institution enough confidence in the ability of the successful candidates to retain them on a permanent basis."

Above all, however, tenure is essential because it protects academic freedom: not only in cases in which a scholar's politics may run counter to those of their department, institution, or funding bodies, but also and most often in cases when a scholar's work innovates in ways that challenge received wisdom in the field.  As much Ellen Schrecker identifies its flaws, she asserts tenure's crucial role in preserving academic freedom:

In elementary and secondary schools, tenure also protects teachers from being fired for personal, political, or other non-work related reasons: tenure prohibits school districts from firing experienced teachers to hire less experienced, less expensive teachers as well as protects teachers from being fired for teaching unpopular, controversial, or otherwise challenged curricula such as evolutionary biology, theology, and controversial literature.

If the "social justice" element of Schrecker's defense makes it seem like present-day assurances of academic freedom create a politically left echo chamber in academic departments, Skoble observes that tenure thus becomes all the more necessary to preserve a diversity of ideas: "There is an orthodoxy in the academy, a well-documented leftward slant in political affiliation.  To Bruce, this is an argument against tenure, but my point is that the more I am persuaded that there is groupthink orthodoxy afoot, the more I want assurances that I would not get fired if I write an essay on free trade or the Second Amendment or a book on anarchism.  I take it the counterargument is that the more entrenched the orthodoxy becomes, the less likely a heterodox scholar will be tenured, or even hired, in the first place... I can see that this poses a problem but fail to see how abolishing tenure would help.  As things stand, some heterodox scholars do get hired and tenured.. If only the heterodox need formal protection, and we have a problem with growing orthodoxy, then eliminating the formal protection will exacerbate the problem."

Skoble argues categorically and plainly against critics that say "tenure protects incompetent professors": "My argument is that when this happens, it is a malfunction of the system, not an intrinsic feature of its proper use.  The way it is supposed to work is that incompetent professors do not get tenure in the first place.  The rebuttal is 'but they do, therefore tenure is a bad idea.'  But that is like arguing that because you ran a red light and caused a train wreck, driving is a bad idea."

Arguments against 
Some have argued that modern tenure systems diminish academic freedom, forcing those seeking tenured positions to profess conformance to the level of mediocrity as those awarding the tenured professorships. For example, according to physicist Lee Smolin, "...it is practically career suicide for a young theoretical physicist not to join the field of string theory."

Economist Steven Levitt, who recommends the elimination of tenure (for economics professors) in order to incentivize higher performance among professors, also points out that a pay increase may be required to compensate faculty members for the lost job security.

Some U.S. states have considered legislation to remove tenure at public universities.

A further criticism of tenure is that it rewards complacency. Once professors are awarded tenure, they may begin putting reduced effort into their job, knowing that their removal is difficult or expensive to the institution.  Another criticism is that it may cause the institution to tolerate incompetent professors if they are tenured.  Gilbert Lycan, a history professor at Stetson University, writing in respect of a fellow professor he deemed unacceptable, stated that "the dean ... would not tolerate ineffective teaching by a non-tenured teacher who was making no effort to improve," thereby tacitly admitting, or at least leaving open the fair inference, that ineffective teaching is tolerated if the professor is tenured.

See also 
 Academic tenure in North America
 Faculty (academic staff)
 Habilitation
 List of academic ranks
 Academic ranks (Australia and New Zealand)

References

Further reading 
 

Academic terminology
Labor relations